Floirac is a commune in the Lot department (46) in south-western France.

Geography
The commune is located in Quercy on the Causse of Floirac. It is watered by the Dordogne, and bordered to the north-west by its tributary, the Tourmente. Floirac has a surface of 19.02 km² and has 265 inhabitants (as of 2016), which makes a population density of 14 inhabitants per km². The coordinates are 44° 55' N and 1° 39' E. The altitude varies between 90 and 345 metres above sea level, with 140 metres at the town hall. The D43 road and a single track railway crosses it.

Neighbouring municipalities

Toponymy
The toponym Floirac is based on the Gallo-Roman anthroponymy Florus. The endpoint -ac is derived from the Gallic -acon suffix (itself of the common Celtic *-Āko-), often latinized in-acum in the texts. This Floracum toponym is found in Floracum fundum which meant: the domain of Florus.

Politics

Places and monuments

 Chapelle Saint-Roch de Floirac (15th century) Listed as a historic monuments on 10 December 1925
 Church Saint-Georges de Floirac (15th century) Listed as a historic monuments on 30 May 1978
 Tour de Floirac, dating from the Middle Ages, registered in the title of historical monuments on 8 August 2013

Notable people
 Jean Dellac (1876-1937) French politician
 Raphael Daubet (1977-) French politician 
 Max Pugh Film director and artist (1977-)
 Jean-Louis Ezine French writer and broadcaster

See also
Communes of the Lot department

References

External links

Official website
Floirac en Quercy 

Communes of Lot (department)